The Partisan Defense Committee describes itself as "a class-struggle, non-sectarian legal and social defense organization that champions cases and causes in the interests of the whole of the working people." The PDC works in accordance with the political orientation of the Spartacist League. The committee organizes demonstrations and performs legal work in defense of "class struggle" prisoners. Its longest standing campaign has been in defense of Mumia Abu-Jamal.

It has also organized counterdemonstrations in response to rallies planned by the Ku Klux Klan and white supremacists.

Campaigns 
The PDC describes the following 15 people as "class-war prisoners" and provides small stipends to them:
 Mumia Abu-Jamal
 Leonard Peltier
 7 members of MOVE 
 Chuck Africa
 Michael Africa
 Debbie Africa
 Janet Africa
 Janine Africa
 Delbert Africa
 Eddie Africa
 Albert Woodfox of the Angola Three
 The remaining 2 of the Ohio 7 
 Jaan Laaman 
 Tom Manning (prisoner)
 Rice–Poindexter case
 Wopashitwe Mondo Eyen we Langa (f.k.a. David Rice)
 Ed Poindexter
 Hugo Pinell of the San Quentin Six

References

External links
 Official site

Legal advocacy organizations in the United States
Mumia Abu-Jamal
Far-left politics in the United States